Natriuretic peptide precursor C, also known as NPPC, is a protein that in humans is encoded by the NPPC gene. The precursor NPPC protein is cleaved to the 22 amino acid peptide C-type natriuretic peptide (CNP).

Function 

Natriuretic peptides comprise a family of 3 structurally related molecules: atrial natriuretic peptide (ANP), brain natriuretic peptide (BNP), and C-type natriuretic peptide (CNP), encoded by a gene symbolized NPPC. These peptides possess potent natriuretic, diuretic, and vasodilating activities and are implicated in body fluid homeostasis and blood pressure control. Unlike ANP and BNP, CNP does not have direct natriuretic activity. This is because CNP is a selective agonist for the B-type natriuretic receptor (NPRB) whereas ANP and BNP are selective for the A-type natriuretic receptor (NPRA). It is synthesized and secreted from the endothelium in response to many stimuli, for example shear stress (like ) and certain proinflammatory cytokines.

References

Further reading

External links